C. P. Radhakrishnan (born 4 May 1957) is an Indian politician who is the 10th and current Governor of Jharkhand since 2023. He was the member of Bharatiya Janata Party (BJP) and was elected to the Lok Sabha twice from Coimbatore. He was also the former state president of the Bharatiya Janata Party in Tamil Nadu. Till recently he was the National Executive Member of the Bharatiya Janata Party and was appointed the Kerala BJP Prabhari (In-Charge) by the party's high command. He was Chairman of the All India Coir Board from 2016 to 2019, which comes under the Ministry of Micro, Small and Medium Enterprises (MSME).

Political career
Radhakrishnan was a two-time member of the Lok Sabha. He won on a BJP ticket in the 1998 and 1999 general elections in the aftermath of the 1998 Coimbatore bombings.

Radhakrishnan won by a margin of over 150,000 votes in 1998 and a margin of 55,000 in the 1999 elections.

In 1999, he stated that voters in Coimbatore did not need convincing to vote for the BJP.

In 2004, he stated that the BJP did not stab any party in the back or cause rifts in ties with other parties.
He was among state leaders who worked on forming alliances in 2004 after the Dravida Munnetra Kazhagam ended its ties with the BJP-led National Democratic Alliance. Radhakrishnan later worked with the state unit to forge ties with the All India Anna Dravida Munnetra Kazhagam for the 2004 elections.

In 2012, Radhakrishnan courted arrest in Mettupalayam for protesting inaction against culprits who had assaulted a Rashtriya Swayamsevak Sangh activist.

He is among the senior-most and respected leaders of the BJP from the south and Tamil Nadu and has been associated with the organisation right from RSS and Jan Sangh from the age of 16 from 1973 for 48 years. In 2014, he was named the BJP candidate for Lok Sabha from Coimbatore Constituency and without the alliance of the two big parties of Tamil Nadu, the DMK and the AIADMK, he secured second place with over 3,89,000 votes, the highest among the Tamil Nadu BJP candidates, losing by the smallest margin among all candidates in Tamil Nadu. He was named the party's candidate once again for the 2019 election from Coimbatore.

Electoral Performances

External links 
Official biographical sketch on the Parliament of India website (12th Lok Sabha)
Official biographical sketch on the Parliament of India website (13th Lok Sabha)

References 

|-

|-

India MPs 1999–2004
India MPs 1998–1999
Politicians from Coimbatore
1957 births
Living people
National Democratic Alliance candidates in the 2014 Indian general election
Bharatiya Janata Party politicians from Tamil Nadu